Fools is a comic fable by Neil Simon, set in the small village of Kulyenchikov, Ukraine, during the late 19th century. The story follows Leon Steponovich Tolchinsky, a schoolteacher who takes a new job educating Sophia, the daughter of Dr. Zubritsky and his wife, Lenya. Leon soon learns that there is a curse on the village that makes everyone stupid, but complications ensue when Leon falls in love with his pupil.

Production
The play premiered on Broadway at the Eugene O'Neill Theatre on April 6, 1981 and closed on May 9, 1981 after 40 performances. Directed by Mike Nichols, the cast included John Rubinstein, Harold Gould, Richard B. Shull, Florence Stanley, and Pamela Reed. The scenery was by John Lee Beatty, costumes by Patricia Zipprodt, lighting by Tharon Musser and music by John Rubinstein.

The play allegedly was written as the result of an agreement Simon made with his wife during their divorce proceedings. She was promised the profits of his next play, so he attempted to write something that never would last on Broadway.

Adaptations
The play was adapted as a stage musical in 1984 titled The Curse of Kulyenchikov, with book and music by Peter Melnick, lyrics by Pat Pattison, and direction by Paul Warner. It ran in April to May 1984 at the Old Library at Leverett House, at Harvard University.

With the permission of Simon, the play was adapted into another musical in 1990, this time with the title Kulyenchikov. It was produced in San Jose, California in November of that year. The revised libretto, and original music and lyrics were by San Francisco Bay Area playwright/composer Ted Kopulos. In addition to the score of 14 songs, an additional character was created - Alexei, Leon's con-artist uncle, who acted as an inadvertent love interest for Yenchna and demonstrated how even the smartest of con men can be beaten at their own game by the stupidest of villagers.

Synopsis

Act One
The story starts with Leon Tolchinsky, an ambitious young schoolteacher (who often breaks the fourth wall), arriving in the village of Kulyenchikov in order to educate a doctor's daughter, Sophia Zubritsky. Upon arrival, Leon encounters a rather unintelligent shepherd by the name of "Something Something Snetsky, the sheep loser." After a confusing and tedious conversation with Snetsky, Leon goes off to find the home of his new employer, Dr. Zubritsky.

After Leon struggles with the locals (Mishkin the postman, Slovitch the butcher, and Yenchna the vendor), the action shifts to the home of Dr. Zubritsky and his wife. We learn that the pair are equally dimwitted as the rest of the characters. Soon, Leon enters and the pair plays out their unintelligent antics on him. When the doctor mentions a curse, Leon discovers that the town's idiocy is no accident, that it is a 200-year curse of stupidity cast on them by Vladimir Yousekevitch after his son killed himself because the first Sophia (not the doctor's daughter, but rather an ancestor with the same name) was forbidden to see Vladimir's son by her father, who found out the boy was illiterate, and made to marry another man. The curse will be broken if Leon is able to educate Sophia. Leon is introduced to the Zubritsky's daughter, Sophia, and is immediately lovestruck. He tries to ask her a few simple questions, but she responds idiotically. Later, Leon talks to the Zubritskys, who tell him that the curse can also be broken if Sophia marries Count Gregor, the last of the Yousekevitch line.

Leon resolves to break the curse. After a moment of faltering when the doctor believes that the meaning of life is "twelve," Leon is more resolved than ever to break the curse when Sophia greets him. Later, Leon encounters the locals again, and Leon learns that the people in Kulyenchikov are also incapable of loving. Leon also meets Count Gregor for the first time, and after a debate, Count Gregor shocks Leon by saying that if Leon can't educate her within 24 hours of his arrival in Kulyenchikov, he, too, will fall victim to the curse. Although Count Gregor proposes to Sophia twice a day, she continually rejects his offers. Leon meets with Sophia again, and she affirms her desire to be able to love him. Leon promises that she will love him the next day.

Act Two
The next morning at 8 o'clock, with more motivation than ever, Leon strives to educate Sophia, attempting and failing to teach her elementary mathematics. However, the lesson soon spirals into a debate, and Leon is unable to educate her. Try as he might, 9am rolls around, as announced by the magistrate, and all seems to be lost.

Even though the curse does not affect Leon, he fools everyone into believing the curse has befallen him. Everybody falls for the trick, but Leon later reveals to Sophia that the curse had no effect on him. Leon believes that the curse is actually a psychological phenomenon which came about because the villagers were always told they were stupid. Leon has a plan, which takes place in the following scenes: Leon convinces Count Gregor to adopt him as a son, thereby being a Yousekevitch himself, and breaking the curse (at least in the minds of the townspeople). Leon and Sophia are set to be wed. At the last minute, Count Gregor admits that the adoption papers are actually divorce papers and the wedding is nearly called off until he "kindly" offers to marry Sophia.

With yet another trick up his sleeve, Leon asks Mishkin the postman for his urgent letter (mentioned earlier). Leon reads the letter and announces that his uncle has died and left all his debts to him. Supposedly, even though the uncle changed his surname, he couldn't escape the debt. when asked what the surname was, he says "Yousekevitch." However, the letter really contained a bill from his college, saying that Leon needed to finish paying his debts. However, the townspeople fall for the trick. Leon and Sophia are wed, and the curse of Kulyenchikov is broken. 

After the wedding, we see what has befallen all the characters as they come onstage one by one. The Magistrate became a great judge, but fell into corruption and eventually was convicted for fraud. Mishkin wrote a six-hundred page novel on the Curse of Kulyenchikov, only to have it lost in the mail. Slovitch confirmed his greatest fears of being hopelessly stupid, when he bought four butcher shops in a town that only needed one and went bankrupt within a month. Snetsky found his sheep, and eventually in time became a great philanthropist. Yenchna went into real estate and now owns seventeen houses in Kulyenchikov, including Count Gregor's mansion. Lenya Zubritsky went into politics (becoming the first female mayor of Kulyenchikov) and now even her husband has to make appointments to see her. Dr. Zubritsky got accepted into a school of medicine and interior design became an esteemed doctor and now works for the Royal Family. Count Gregor renounced his bad ways and became the town monk. Occasionally he goes to the top of the hill to pray for God to throw water upon the village. Leon continues to teach, and Sophia happily bore their child and teaches Leon lessons of life.

Characters
Leon Steponovitch Tolchinsky - the protagonist, a young schoolteacher who is sent to Kulyenchikov to teach Sophia. He is unaffected by the curse of idiocy set on Kulyenchikov by Vladimir Yousekevitch.
Sophia Irena Elenya Zubritsky - Teenage Kulyenchikovite who is cursed with idiocy alongside the rest of Kulyenchikov by Count Gregor. Daughter of Dr. Nikolai and Lenya and love interest to Leon.
Gregor Mikhailovitch Breznofsky Fyodor Yousekevitch ("Count Gregor") - the antagonist, the last ancestor to Vladimir Yousekevitch who cursed Kulyenchikov with idiocy 200 years ago.
Dr. Nikolai Zubritsky - Father of Sophia, and husband of Lenya. He employed Leon to educate his daughter. Cursed with idiocy by Vladimir Yousekevitch.
Lenya Zubritsky - Mother of Sophia, and wife of Dr. Nikolai. Cursed with idiocy by Vladimir Yousekevitch.
Something-Something Snetsky - A shepherd in Kulyenchikov. Known as “the sheep loser”. Cursed with idiocy by Vladimir Yousekevitch.
Mishkin - A young, and rather handsome postman in Kulyenchikov. Cursed with idiocy by Vladimir Yousekevitch.
Slovitch - An animal-loving Butcher in Kulyenchikov. Cursed with idiocy by Vladimir Yousekevitch.
Yenchna - A sweet but forgetful vendor in Kulyenchikov. Cursed with idiocy by Vladimir Yousekevitch.
Magistrate - Timid judicial officer in Kulyenchikov. Cursed with idiocy by Vladimir Yousekevitch.

Optional Character Additions
Kelina - A young waitress in Kulyenchikov. Cursed with idiocy by Vladimir Yousekevitch.
Sister Bobka - Leader of the Kulyenchikov convent, she a homicidal and mischievous nun in Kulyenchikov. Cursed with idiocy by Vladimir Yousekevitch.
Sister Kachoom - An arson-loving nun who eventually converts to Pastafarianism. Cursed with idiocy by Vladimir Yousekevitch.
Sister Gi - The final and most dense member of the nun trio, Sister Gi holds the nuclear codes of Kulyenchikov, she almost accidentally drops nuculear bombs onto Kulyenchikov several times throughout the show. Cursed with idiocy by Vladimir Yousekevitch.
Svedka - A teenage babysitter in Kulyenchikov struggling with alcoholism. They goes missing halfway through the play, with Count Gregor as the suspected culprit. Cursed with idiocy by Vladimir Yousekevitch. (Svedka uses They/She pronouns)
Ivan - A young farmer in Kulyenchikov. Boyfriend to Mishkin. Cursed with idiocy by Vladimir Yousekevitch.
Thebish - The lovable military leader in Kulyenchikov, who is seemingly the smartest Kulyenchikovite, but is called in to question by many other characters throughout the play. Cursed with idiocy by Vladimir Yousekevitch.

Reception
In his review for The New York Times, Frank Rich wrote: "As one watches Mr. Simon, the director Mike Nichols and a topflight cast struggle to puff up this show, a feeling of unreality sets in. It's as if a team of brilliant high-priced surgeons has been assembled to operate on a splinter. While Mr. Simon has come up with a few funny moments, there are only so many jokes that anyone can make about stupidity. Once we learn that the town peddler sells flowers as whitefish, that the town doctor can't read his own eye chart and that the town shepherd can't find his sheep, there's an inevitability about every punch line."

References

External links

Fools at the Internet Broadway Database

1981 plays
Broadway plays
Plays by Neil Simon
Ukraine in fiction
Fiction set in the 1890s